Livia, also known as Livia Drusilla and Julia Augusta, is a Roman Empress and the wife of Augustus.

Livia may also refer to:
 Livia (given name), a list of people and fictional characters
 Livia gens, an ancient Roman family
 Anna Livia (author) (1955–2007), lesbian feminist author and linguist
 Livia (fungus), a genus of fungi in the order Helotiales
 Livia (novel), by Lawrence Durrell
 Livia, a wearable device for menstrual pain relief created by iPulse Medical

See also
 Llívia